Dominique Arnaud (19 September 1955 – 20 July 2016) was a French racing cyclist. He rode in eleven editions of the Tour de France.

Arnaud won three stages in the Vuelta a España, a stage in the Midi Libre and the Tour du Limousin in 1983.

Personal life

Death
Arnaud lived in Mées, but died of cancer in a hospital in Dax. A week before his death, a square in Mées was named after him.

Major results

1980
1st Stage 16a Vuelta a España
10th Trofeo Masferrer
1981
2nd GP Ouest-France
2nd Overall Tour du Limousin
2nd Overall Étoile des Espoirs
10th Overall Tour du Vaucluse
1982
1st Stage 14 Vuelta a España
1983
1st  Overall Tour du Limousin
1st GP de la Ville de Rennes
6th GP Ouest-France
1984
4th La Flèche Wallonne
7th Circuit Cycliste Sarthe
9th Overall Tour du Limousin
1985
1st Stage 3a Tour d'Armorique
1st Maël-Pestivien
4th Grand Prix de Mauléon-Moulins
9th Overall Tour du Limousin
1st Stage 4
1986
1st Stage 5a Volta a Catalunya
1987
1st Stage 16 Vuelta a España
1st Stage 3 Vuelta a Andalucía
1988
2nd Boucles de l'Aulne
1990
1st Stage 4 Tour du Vaucluse
2nd Overall GP du Midi-Libre
1st Stage 6 (ITT)

Grand Tour general classification results timeline

References

External links
 Profile & stats – De Wielersite

1955 births
2016 deaths
French male cyclists
French Vuelta a España stage winners
Sportspeople from Landes (department)
Cyclists from Nouvelle-Aquitaine
21st-century French people
20th-century French people